José de San Martín (1778–1850) was a Spanish-Argentine general and the prime leader of the southern and central parts of South America's struggle for independence from the Spanish Empire.

General José de San Martín or General San Martín may also refer to:
 San Martín, Buenos Aires, full name "Ciudad del Libertador General Don José de San Martín"
 General José de San Martín, Chaco
 Libertador General San Martín Department, Chaco
 Libertador General José de San Martín Airport
 SS Thuringia (1922), named "General San Martín"
 General San Martín Partido
 General San Martín Department, Córdoba
 Libertador General San Martín, Jujuy
 Libertador General San Martín Department, San Luis
 Centro Cultural General San Martín
 Ferrocarril General San Martín
 Teatro General San Martín in Buenos Aires
 Teatro del Libertador General San Martín in Córdoba
 General San Martín Park
 General Jose de San Martin Memorial, Washington, D.C.

See also
 San Martín (disambiguation)